This is a list of active and extinct volcanoes in Sudan.

References

Sudan
 
Volcanoes